"Bad Babysitter" is a song by American rapper and producer Princess Superstar, released on February 18, 2002, through Rapster Records as the second single from her fourth studio album, Princess Superstar Is (2001). The song was written by Princess Superstar (as Concetta Kirschner), Milo Berger, and Erik Meltzer, produced by Milo "DJ Mighty Mi" Berger, and performed by Princess Superstar and the High & Mighty. It was her first single to enter the UK Singles Chart, peaking at number 11 in late February 2002 and spending seven weeks inside the top 75. Worldwide, the song charted in Australia, Flanders, Germany, and Ireland.

Track listing

Personnel
 Princess Superstar – main artist, songwriter (as Concetta Kirschner), vocals
 Erik Meltzer – featured artist, songwriter, vocals
 Milo Berger – featured artist, songwriter, producer
 Greg Vaughn – mastering
 Raphael Fuchs – photography
 Klaus Dahmen – layout
 Mark James – remixing

Charts

Weekly charts

Year-end charts

References

External links
 

2001 songs
2002 singles
Princess Superstar songs
Songs written by Princess Superstar